Transandean (Spanish: Transandino) may refer to things relative to:
Argentina (Chilean usage)
Chile (Argentine usage)
Peru
Bolivia  

The term is also used to name some infrastructure that crosses the Andes like the:
Trans-Andean railways
Transandine Railway, Argentina and Chile
Trans-Andean Highway, Venezuela
Transandino pipeline, Colombia